Dmitri Vladimirovich Sukharev (born 25 December 1960) is a Russian former basketball player. He competed in the men's tournament at the 1992 Summer Olympics.

References

External links
 

1960 births
Living people
Basketball players at the 1992 Summer Olympics
Olympic basketball players of the Unified Team
People from Sughd Region
Soviet men's basketball players
Russian men's basketball players
1990 FIBA World Championship players
BC Dynamo Moscow players
PBC CSKA Moscow players